Leiter is an unincorporated community in eastern Sheridan County, Wyoming, United States, along Clear Creek.  It lies along the concurrent U.S. Routes 14 and 16, east of the city of Sheridan, the county seat of Sheridan County.  Its elevation is 3,779 feet (1,152 m). Although Leiter is unincorporated, it has a post office, with the ZIP code of 82837. Public education in the community of Clearmont is provided by Sheridan County School District #3.

The location is named after Levi Z. Leiter (by reference to the Leiter estate) who owned a large ranch in the area.

Climate

According to the Köppen Climate Classification system, Leiter has a hot-summer humid continental climate, abbreviated "Dfa" on climate maps.

References

Unincorporated communities in Sheridan County, Wyoming
Unincorporated communities in Wyoming